The 2020 Missouri Secretary of State General election was held on November 3, 2020, to elect the Secretary of State of Missouri. It was held concurrently with the 2020 U.S. presidential election, along with elections to the United States Senate and United States House of Representatives, as well as various state and local elections. Incumbent Republican Secretary of State Jay Ashcroft won re-election to a second term. Ashcroft won with more votes than any candidate in Missouri history.

Republican primary

Candidates

Declared
 Jay Ashcroft, incumbent Secretary of State of Missouri

Withdrawn before primary
 Dale Manzo, student at Harvard University and COO of Manchester Electrical Contractors

Results

Democratic primary

Candidates

Declared
Yinka Faleti, nonprofit executive and U.S. Army veteran

Results

Third parties

Constitution Party

Candidates

Declared
 Paul Venable, information technology consultant

Results

Green Party

Candidates

Declared
 Paul Lehmann, farmer

Results

Libertarian Party

Candidates

Declared
 Carl Herman Freese, security officer

Results

General election

Predictions

Polling

Results

See also 
 2020 Missouri gubernatorial election

Notes

References

Secretary of State
Missouri Secretary of State elections
Missouri